The UK Albums Chart is a weekly record chart based on sales of albums in the United Kingdom; the term "Christmas number ones" refers to the records that are at the top of the chart on Christmas Day. Typically, the Christmas number one is the album that was announced as number one on the Sunday before 25 December. When Christmas Day falls on a Sunday itself, the official number one is the one announced on that day's chart. , 60 albums have been Christmas number ones.

The UK Albums Chart is based on Sunday to Saturday sales of both physical and digital albums. It is compiled by the Official Charts Company (OCC) on behalf of the UK music industry, and each week's new number one is first announced on Sunday evenings on The Radio 1 Chart Show. The album chart was first published by Record Mirror in 1956. The record at number one on 25 December that year was the original soundtrack to the 1956 film The King and I, making it the first ever UK Christmas number one album; The King and I soundtrack was also Christmas number one in 1957, the following year. In 1958, the original soundtrack to South Pacific became the second Christmas number one album. Staying at the top of the album chart for a total of 115 weeks, it was also number one in 1959 and 1960. Soundtracks to the movies The Sound of Music and Grease also became Christmas number ones.

Record labels earn as much as forty per cent of their annual sales during the festive season. Speaking in 2009, music retailer Geoff Bonouvrie remarked: "The whole psychology of buying changes around Christmas. ... People's buying habits change. They are buying gifts for other people." As a result of this, topping the album chart for 25 December is considered prestigious among the industry, as Christmas number one albums often sell in high quantities. Between 1986 and 2012, 23 of the 27 Christmas number one albums were featured in the top three of their respective year-end bestsellers chart.

Betting shops in the UK often run books regarding which albums will be at number one for Christmas. For example, in 2010, British bookmakers William Hill and Ladbrokes both issued odds of 2/5 on for Take That to top the album chart at Christmas. At the time, these were the lowest odds William Hill had ever offered for a prediction on the Christmas number-one album. In 2011, Christmas by Canadian singer Michael Bublé became the Christmas number one. In a statement, Bublé announced that he was "thrilled" to have achieved the feat. The following year, Scottish singer-songwriter Emeli Sandé topped the chart at Christmas. The 2014 Christmas number one was claimed by Ed Sheeran, who achieved the biggest one-week sales of any artist album that year with X; the next year, 25 by Adele topped the Christmas chart with sales of 450,000.

Following the December 1983 release of the first album in the Now That's What I Call Music series, compilation albums featuring various artists became very popular in the UK during the mid to late 1980s; this is reflected in the albums that were Christmas number one during this time. From 1983 to 1987, every album at the top of the Christmas chart was a various artists compilation album, from either the Now That's What I Call Music or the Hits series. The UK Albums Chart was subsequently altered so that, from 14 January 1989, releases from various artists were no longer eligible for the main album chart.

Number ones

, there have been 61 Christmas number one albums. The most successful act is The Beatles, who have topped the Christmas chart with seven different albums. With the exception of 1966, they reached number one on every Christmas chart from 1963 to 1969, and also topped the chart in 2000 with their singles collection, 1. The only other act to release more than three Christmas number one albums is British singer Robbie Williams, who has topped the chart with four solo albums. Williams also featured as part of Take That on their 2010 album, Progress. Take That have had three Christmas number one albums.

The most successful record label is Virgin Records, who have released eight Christmas number one albums. Benefitting from sales of the Now That's What I Call Music! compilation series, Virgin achieved four of the five Christmas number ones between 1983 and 1987. From 14 January 1989, compilation albums featuring various artists were no longer included in the UK Albums Chart.

References
General

The albums, artists and number of weeks at number one are those given by The Official UK Charts Company:

Specific

External links
Official UK Albums Top 100 at the Official Charts Company

Christmas
Christmas in the United Kingdom
UK 1